Omicron Orionis refers to 2 distinct star systems in the constellation Orion:

 ο1 Orionis (4 Orionis), an M3S semiregular variable star
 ο2 Orionis (9 Orionis), a K2 giant star

All of them were member of asterism 參旗 (Sān Qí), Banner of Three Stars, Net mansion.

See also
o Orionis (22 Orionis)

References

Orion (constellation)
Orionis, Omicron